The Galilean moons, or Galilean satellites, are the four largest moons of Jupiter: Io, Europa, Ganymede, and Callisto. They were first seen by Galileo Galilei in December 1609 or January 1610, and recognized by him as satellites of Jupiter in March 1610. They were the first objects found to orbit a planet other than the Earth.

They are among the largest objects in the Solar System with the exception of the Sun and the eight planets, with radii greater than any of the dwarf planets. Ganymede is the largest moon in the Solar System, and is even bigger than the planet Mercury, though only around half as massive. The three inner moons—Io, Europa, and Ganymede—are in a 4:2:1 orbital resonance with each other. While the Galilean moons are spherical, all of Jupiter's much smaller remaining moons have irregular forms because of their weaker self-gravitation.

The Galilean moons were observed in either 1609 or 1610 when Galileo made improvements to his telescope, which enabled him to observe celestial bodies more distinctly than ever. Galileo's observations showed the importance of the telescope as a tool for astronomers by proving that there were objects in space that cannot be seen by the naked eye. The discovery of celestial bodies orbiting something other than Earth dealt a serious blow to the then-accepted Ptolemaic world system, a geocentric theory in which everything orbits around Earth.

Galileo initially named his discovery the Cosmica Sidera ("Cosimo's stars"), but the names that eventually prevailed were chosen by Simon Marius. Marius discovered the moons independently at nearly the same time as Galileo, 8 January 1610, and gave them their present names, derived from rape victims of Zeus, which were suggested by Johannes Kepler, in his Mundus Jovialis, published in 1614.

The four Galilean moons were the only known moons of Jupiter until the discovery of Amalthea in 1892.

History

Discovery 

As a result of improvements Galileo Galilei made to the telescope, with a magnifying capability of 20×, he was able to see celestial bodies more distinctly than was previously possible. This allowed Galileo to observe in either December 1609 or January 1610 what came to be known as the Galilean moons.

On January 7, 1610, Galileo wrote a letter containing the first mention of Jupiter's moons. At the time, he saw only three of them, and he believed them to be fixed stars near Jupiter. He continued to observe these celestial orbs from January 8 to March 2, 1610. In these observations, he discovered a fourth body, and also observed that the four were not fixed stars, but rather were orbiting Jupiter.

Galileo's discovery proved the importance of the telescope as a tool for astronomers by showing that there were objects in space to be discovered that until then had remained unseen by the naked eye. More importantly, the discovery of celestial bodies orbiting something other than Earth dealt a blow to the then-accepted Ptolemaic world system, which held that Earth was at the center of the universe and all other celestial bodies revolved around it. Galileo's March 13, 1610, Sidereus Nuncius (Starry Messenger), which announced celestial observations through his telescope, does not explicitly mention Copernican heliocentrism, a theory that placed the Sun at the center of the universe. Nevertheless, Galileo accepted the Copernican theory.

A Chinese historian of astronomy, Xi Zezong, has claimed that a "small reddish star" observed near Jupiter in 364 BCE by Chinese astronomer Gan De may have been Ganymede. If true, this might predate Galileo's discovery by around two millennia. 

The observations of Simon Marius are another noted example of observation, and he later reported observing the moons in 1609. However, because he did not publish these findings until after Galileo, there is a degree of uncertainty around his records.

Names 

In 1605, Galileo had been employed as a mathematics tutor for Cosimo de' Medici. In 1609, Cosimo became Grand Duke Cosimo II of Tuscany. Galileo, seeking patronage from his now-wealthy former student and his powerful family, used the discovery of Jupiter's moons to gain it. On February 13, 1610, Galileo wrote to the Grand Duke's secretary:

"God graced me with being able, through such a singular sign, to reveal to my Lord my devotion and the desire I have that his glorious name live as equal among the stars, and since it is up to me, the first discoverer, to name these new planets, I wish, in imitation of the great sages who placed the most excellent heroes of that age among the stars, to inscribe these with the name of the Most Serene Grand Duke."

Galileo initially called his discovery the Cosmica Sidera ("Cosimo's stars"), in honour of Cosimo alone, At Cosimo's secretary suggested to change the name to Medicea Sidera ("the Medician stars"), honouring all four Medici brothers (Cosimo, Francesco, Carlo, and Lorenzo). The discovery was announced in the Sidereus Nuncius ("Starry Messenger"), published in Venice in March 1610, less than two months after the first observations.

On March 12, 1610, Galileo wrote his dedicatory letter to the Duke of Tuscany, and the next day sent a copy to the Grand Duke, hoping to obtain the Grand Duke's support as quickly as possible. On March 19, he sent the telescope he had used to first view Jupiter's moons to the Grand Duke, along with an official copy of Sidereus Nuncius (The Starry Messenger) that, following the secretary's advice, named the four moons the Medician Stars. In his dedicatory introduction, Galileo wrote:

Scarcely have the immortal graces of your soul begun to shine forth on earth than bright stars offer themselves in the heavens which, like tongues, will speak of and celebrate your most excellent virtues for all time. Behold, therefore, four stars reserved for your illustrious name ... which ... make their journeys and orbits with a marvelous speed around the star of Jupiter ... like children of the same family ... Indeed, it appears the Maker of the Stars himself, by clear arguments, admonished me to call these new planets by the illustrious name of Your Highness before all others.

Other names put forward include:
 I. Principharus (for the "prince" of Tuscany), II. Victripharus (after Vittoria della Rovere), III. Cosmipharus (after Cosimo de' Medici) and IV. Fernipharus (after Duke Ferdinando de' Medici) – by Giovanni Battista Hodierna, a disciple of Galileo and author of the first ephemerides (Medicaeorum Ephemerides, 1656);
 Circulatores Jovis, or Jovis Comites – by Johannes Hevelius;
 Gardes, or Satellites (from the Latin satelles, satellitis, meaning "escorts") – by Jacques Ozanam.

The names that eventually prevailed were chosen by Simon Marius, who discovered the moons independently at the same time as Galileo: he named them at the suggestion of Johannes Kepler after lovers of the god Zeus (the Greek equivalent of Jupiter), in his Mundus Jovialis, published in 1614:

Jupiter is much blamed by the poets on account of his irregular loves. Three maidens are especially mentioned as having been clandestinely courted by Jupiter with success. Io, daughter of the River Inachus, Callisto of Lycaon, Europa of Agenor. Then there was Ganymede, the handsome son of King Tros, whom Jupiter, having taken the form of an eagle, transported to heaven on his back, as poets fabulously tell... I think, therefore, that I shall not have done amiss if the First is called by me Io, the Second Europa, the Third, on account of its majesty of light, Ganymede, the Fourth Callisto... This fancy, and the particular names given, were suggested to me by Kepler, Imperial Astronomer, when we met at Ratisbon fair in October 161 3. So if, as a jest, and in memory of our friendship then begun, I hail him as joint father of these four stars, again I shall nit be doing wrong.

Galileo steadfastly refused to use Marius' names and invented as a result the numbering scheme that is still used nowadays, in parallel with proper moon names. The numbers run from Jupiter outward, thus I, II, III and IV for Io, Europa, Ganymede, and Callisto respectively. Galileo used this system in his notebooks but never actually published it. The numbered names (Jupiter x) were used until the mid-20th century when other inner moons were discovered, and Marius' names became widely used.

Determination of longitude 

Galileo's discovery had practical applications. Safe navigation required accurately determining a ship's position at sea. While latitude could be measured well enough by local astronomical observations, determining longitude required knowledge of the time of each observation synchronized to the time at a reference longitude. The longitude problem was so important that large prizes were offered for its solution at various times by Spain, Holland and Britain. 

Galileo proposed determining longitude based on the timing of the orbits of the Galilean moons. The times of the eclipses of the moons could be precisely calculated in advance and compared with local observations on land or on ship to determine the local time and hence longitude. Galileo applied in 1616 for the Spanish prize of 6,000 gold ducats with a lifetime pension of 2,000 a year, and almost two decades later for the Dutch prize, but by then he was under house arrest for possible heresy.

The main problem with the Jovian moon technique was that it was difficult to observe the Galilean moons through a telescope on a moving ship, a problem that Galileo tried to solve with the invention of the celatone. Others suggested improvements, but without success.

Land mapping surveys had same problem determining longitude, though with less severe observational conditions. The method proved practical and was used by Giovanni Domenico Cassini and Jean Picard to re-map France.

Members 

Some models predict that there may have been several generations of Galilean satellites in Jupiter's early history. Each generation of moons to have formed would have spiraled into Jupiter and been destroyed, due to tidal interactions with Jupiter's proto-satellite disk, with new moons forming from the remaining debris. By the time the present generation formed, the gas in the proto-satellite disk had thinned out to the point that it no longer greatly interfered with the moons' orbits.

Other models suggest that Galilean satellites formed in a proto-satellite disk, in which formation timescales were comparable to or shorter than orbital migration timescales.  Io is anhydrous and likely has an interior of rock and metal. Europa is thought to contain 8% ice and water by mass with the remainder rock. These moons are, in increasing order of distance from Jupiter:

Io 

Io (Jupiter I) is the innermost of the four Galilean moons of Jupiter; with a diameter of 3642 kilometers, it is the fourth-largest moon in the Solar System, and is only marginally larger than Earth's moon. It was named after Io, a priestess of Hera who became one of the lovers of Zeus. It was referred to as "Jupiter I", or "The first satellite of Jupiter" until the mid-20th century.

With over 400 active volcanos, Io is the most geologically active object in the Solar System. Its surface is dotted with more than 100 mountains, some of which are taller than Earth's Mount Everest. Unlike most satellites in the outer Solar System (which have a thick coating of ice), Io is primarily composed of silicate rock surrounding a molten iron or iron sulfide core.

Although not proven, data from the Galileo orbiter indicates that Io might have its own magnetic field. Io has an extremely thin atmosphere made up mostly of sulfur dioxide (SO2). If a surface data or collection vessel were to land on Io in the future, it would have to be extremely tough (similar to the tank-like bodies of the Soviet Venera landers) to survive the radiation and magnetic fields that originate from Jupiter.

Europa 

Europa (Jupiter II), the second of the four Galilean moons, is the second closest to Jupiter and the smallest at 3121.6 kilometers in diameter, which is slightly smaller than Earth's Moon. The name comes from a mythical Phoenician noblewoman, Europa, who was courted by Zeus and became the queen of Crete, though the name did not become widely used until the mid-20th century.

It has a smooth and bright surface, with a layer of water surrounding the mantle of the planet, thought to be 100 kilometers thick. The smooth surface includes a layer of ice, while the bottom of the ice is theorized to be liquid water. The apparent youth and smoothness of the surface have led to the hypothesis that a water ocean exists beneath it, which could conceivably serve as an abode for extraterrestrial life. Heat energy from tidal flexing ensures that the ocean remains liquid and drives geological activity. Life may exist in Europa's under-ice ocean. So far, there is no evidence that life exists on Europa, but the likely presence of liquid water has spurred calls to send a probe there.

The prominent markings that criss-cross the moon seem to be mainly albedo features, which emphasize low topography. There are few craters on Europa because its surface is tectonically active and young. Some theories suggest that Jupiter's gravity is causing these markings, as one side of Europa is constantly facing Jupiter. Volcanic water eruptions splitting the surface of Europa, and even geysers have also been considered as a cause. The color of the markings, reddish-brown, is theorized to be caused by sulfur, but scientists cannot confirm that, because no data collection devices have been sent to Europa. Europa is primarily made of silicate rock and likely has an iron core. It has a tenuous atmosphere composed primarily of oxygen.

Ganymede 

Ganymede (Jupiter III), the third Galilean moon, is named after the mythological Ganymede, cupbearer of the Greek gods and Zeus's beloved. Ganymede is the largest natural satellite in the Solar System at 5262.4 kilometers in diameter, which makes it larger than the planet Mercury – although only at about half of its mass since Ganymede is an icy world. It is the only satellite in the Solar System known to possess a magnetosphere, likely created through convection within the liquid iron core.

Ganymede is composed primarily of silicate rock and water ice, and a salt-water ocean is believed to exist nearly 200 km below Ganymede's surface, sandwiched between layers of ice. The metallic core of Ganymede suggests a greater heat at some time in its past than had previously been proposed. The surface is a mix of two types of terrain—highly cratered dark regions and younger, but still ancient, regions with a large array of grooves and ridges. Ganymede has a high number of craters, but many are gone or barely visible due to its icy crust forming over them. The satellite has a thin oxygen atmosphere that includes O, O2, and possibly O3 (ozone), and some atomic hydrogen.

Callisto 

Callisto (Jupiter IV) is the fourth and last Galilean moon, and is the second-largest of the four, and at 4820.6 kilometers in diameter, it is the third largest moon in the Solar System, and barely smaller than Mercury, though only a third of the latter's mass. It is named after the Greek mythological nymph Callisto, a lover of Zeus who was a daughter of the Arkadian King Lykaon and a hunting companion of the goddess Artemis. The moon does not form part of the orbital resonance that affects three inner Galilean satellites and thus does not experience appreciable tidal heating. Callisto is composed of approximately equal amounts of rock and ices, which makes it the least dense of the Galilean moons. It is one of the most heavily cratered satellites in the Solar System, and one major feature is a basin around 3000 km wide called Valhalla.

Callisto is surrounded by an extremely thin atmosphere composed of carbon dioxide and probably molecular oxygen. Investigation revealed that Callisto may possibly have a subsurface ocean of liquid water at depths less than 300 kilometres. The likely presence of an ocean within Callisto indicates that it can or could harbour life. However, this is less likely than on nearby Europa. Callisto has long been considered the most suitable place for a human base for future exploration of the Jupiter system since it is furthest from the intense radiation of Jupiter.

Comparative structure 

Fluctuations in the orbits of the moons indicate that their mean density decreases with distance from Jupiter. Callisto, the outermost and least dense of the four, has a density intermediate between ice and rock whereas Io, the innermost and densest moon, has a density intermediate between rock and iron. Callisto has an ancient, heavily cratered and unaltered ice surface and the way it rotates indicates that its density is equally distributed, suggesting that it has no rocky or metallic core but consists of a homogeneous mix of rock and ice. This may well have been the original structure of all the moons. The rotation of the three inner moons, in contrast, indicates differentiation of their interiors with denser matter at the core and lighter matter above. They also reveal significant alteration of the surface. Ganymede reveals past tectonic movement of the ice surface which required partial melting of subsurface layers. Europa reveals more dynamic and recent movement of this nature, suggesting a thinner ice crust. Finally, Io, the innermost moon, has a sulfur surface, active volcanism and no sign of ice. All this evidence suggests that the nearer a moon is to Jupiter the hotter its interior. The current model is that the moons experience tidal heating as a result of the gravitational field of Jupiter in inverse proportion to the square of their distance from the giant planet. In all but Callisto this will have melted the interior ice, allowing rock and iron to sink to the interior and water to cover the surface. In Ganymede a thick and solid ice crust then formed. In warmer Europa a thinner more easily broken crust formed. In Io the heating is so extreme that all the rock has melted and water has long ago boiled out into space.

Size

Latest flyby

Origin and evolution

Jupiter's regular satellites are believed to have formed from a circumplanetary disk, a ring of accreting gas and solid debris analogous to a protoplanetary disk. They may be the remnants of a score of Galilean-mass satellites that formed early in Jupiter's history.

Simulations suggest that, while the disk had a relatively high mass at any given moment, over time a substantial fraction (several tenths of a percent) of the mass of Jupiter captured from the Solar nebula was processed through it. However, the disk mass of only 2% that of Jupiter is required to explain the existing satellites. Thus there may have been several generations of Galilean-mass satellites in Jupiter's early history. Each generation of moons would have spiraled into Jupiter, due to drag from the disk, with new moons then forming from the new debris captured from the Solar nebula. By the time the present (possibly fifth) generation formed, the disk had thinned out to the point that it no longer greatly interfered with the moons' orbits. The current Galilean moons were still affected, falling into and being partially protected by an orbital resonance which still exists for Io, Europa, and Ganymede. Ganymede's larger mass means that it would have migrated inward at a faster rate than Europa or Io. Tidal dissipation in the Jovian system is still ongoing and Callisto will likely be captured into the resonance in about 1.5 billion years, creating a 1:2:4:8 chain.

Visibility

All four Galilean moons are bright enough to be viewed from Earth without a telescope, if only they could appear farther away from Jupiter. (They are, however, easily distinguished with even low-powered binoculars.) They have apparent magnitudes between 4.6 and 5.6 when Jupiter is in opposition with the Sun, and are about one unit of magnitude dimmer when Jupiter is in conjunction. The main difficulty in observing the moons from Earth is their proximity to Jupiter, since they are obscured by its brightness. The maximum angular separations of the moons are between 2 and 10 arcminutes from Jupiter, which is close to the limit of human visual acuity. Ganymede and Callisto, at their maximum separation, are the likeliest targets for potential naked-eye observation.

Orbit animations
GIF animations depicting the Galilean moon orbits and the resonance of Io, Europa, and Ganymede

See also 
 Jupiter's moons in fiction
Colonization of the Jovian System

Notes

References

External links

 Sky & Telescope utility for identifying Galilean moons
Interactive 3D visualisation of Jupiter and the Galilean moons

 NASA's Stunning Discoveries on Jupiter's Largest Moons | Our Solar System's Moons

 A Beginner's Guide to Jupiter's Moons
Dominic Ford: The Moons of Jupiter. With a chart of the current position of the Galilean moons.

 
Copernican Revolution
Moons of Jupiter
Moons with a prograde orbit